Iacanga is a municipality in the state of São Paulo in Brazil. The population is 11,858 (2020 est.) in an area of 547 km². Its altitude is 422 meters. Iacanga was the place of the first "Aguas Claras Festival", also announced as the "Brazilian Woodstock." Also known in the region, through the traditional Cowboy Festival, commemorating the anniversary of the city on 15 April.

References

Municipalities in São Paulo (state)